Rennae Stubbs and Todd Woodbridge were the defending champions, but lost in the first round to Martina Navratilova and Leander Paes.

Lisa Raymond and Mike Bryan won the title, defeating Katarina Srebotnik and Bob Bryan 7–6(11–9), 7–6(7–1) in the final.

Seeds

Draw

Finals

Top half

Bottom half

External links
 Official Results Archive (WTA)
2002 US Open – Doubles draws and results at the International Tennis Federation

2002 US Open (tennis)
US Open (tennis) by year – Mixed doubles